Local elections are scheduled to be held in Mexico on June 6, 2021. Local elections will be held for thirty state congresses, 1,900 town halls (ayuntamientos or municipalities), Mexico City borough mayors, municipal boards and municipal presidents. Fifteen gubernatorial elections and federal legislative elections will be held the same day.

Governors of 25 states and Mexico City signed an agreement with President Andrés Manuel López Obrador (AMLO) to stay neutral during the elections, to allow the free will of the people, to reject money from organized crime, and to refrain from using official funds to support any particular candidates or parties.

The party was fined MXN $6,714,893.30. Two gubernatorial, 25 federal deputies, six local deputies, 12 municipal presidents, and four borough president candidates were affected. Two candidates for federal deputy and one for governor of Michoacan from the Michoacán a Redes Sociales Progresistas were also withdrawn.

The INE said that 300 polling places could not be installed in Chiapas, Michoacán or Oaxaca on June 6 due to social conditions that make voting dangerous or impossible.

States

Aguascalientes
27 deputies, 11 municipalities

Baja California
Governor, 25 deputies, 5 municipalities

Nearly all the current member of the Congress of Baja California are seeking reelection. Five have been granted leave to seek other positions:

Gubnatorial candidates:
 Marina del Pilar Ávila Olmeda (Juntos Haremos Historia ) was declared the winner with 48.1% of the vote.
Miguel Ángel Bujanda, Independent (formerly )
Gerardo López 
David Ruvalcaba 

Municipal president:
Mexicali Municipality – Norma Bustamante 
Tijuana Municipality – 2021 Tijuana Elections -  Montserrat Cabellero Ramirez won 48.45% of the vote in Tijuana city.

Baja California Sur
Governor, 21 deputies, 5 municipalities

Governor:
Víctor Manuel Castro Cosío,

Campeche
Governor, 25 deputies, 13 municipalities, 22 municipal juntas

Governor: Layda Elena Sansores, 
List of presidents of Campeche Municipality: Biby Karen Rabelo,

Chiapas
40 deputies, 124 municipalities

Mayoral candidates:
Comitán – Constantino Kánter , former mayor of Comitán (2005–2007). Kanter is known for supporting ranchers and landowners against indigenous rights and against the Zapatista Army of National Liberation (EZLN) during the 1994 uprising.

Chihuahua
Governor, 33 deputies, 67 municipalities, 67 municipality receiverships

Governor of Chihuahua: María Eugenia Campos Galván 

Mayors:
Nuevo Casas Grandes – Yuriel Armando González Lara; assassinated on March 4, 2021.

Coahuila

38 municipalities

Colima
Governor, 25 deputies, 10 municipalities

Governor of Colima: Indira Vizcaíno Silva

Durango
25 deputies

Guanajuato
36 deputies, 46 municipalities

Mayors:
León – Ricardo Sheffield, former mayor of León ( 2009–2012) and candidate for governor in 2018()

Alderman:
Apaseo el Grande: – Alejandro Galicia Juárez , murdered on March 31, 2021. Mayor Juan Ignacio de la Cruz Ávila is seriously injured.

Guerrero
Governor, 46 deputies, 80 municipalities

List of governors of Guerrero: Evelyn Salgado  was declared the winner with 44% of the vote.  and  called for a recount.

Mayoral candidates:
Acapulco (municipality): Abelina López

Hidalgo
30 deputies

Jalisco
38 deputies, 125 municipalities

Mayors:
Guadalajara – Ismael del Toro  (incumbent) Winner of the 2021 Guadalajara municipal election.
Zapopan-In the poll prior to the election, Zapopan had a technical tie since Juan José Frangie Saade from the party Movimiento Ciudadano had 30.8% while Alberto Uribe Camacho from National Regeneration Movement (Movimiento de Regeneración Nacional,  MORENA) had 28.3%. The candidate Juan José Frangie Saade from the party Movimiento Ciudadano won the election with 46% of the votes. In Zapopan, the third place in the election was won by Pedro Kumamoto from the party Futuro; a local political party from Jalisco that started as a social movement in 2013 and became a political party in 2020.
Tlajomulco de Zúñiga- The poll before the election showed that Salvador Zamora Zamora from the party Movimiento Ciudadano had 35.1% of the votes, while Marcela Michel from National Regeneration Movement (Movimiento de Regeneración Nacional,  MORENA) was in second place with 27.1%. Salvador Zamora Zamora from party Movimiento Ciudadano won the election, but he only got 17% of the votes. This means that he will be ruling with about 83% of the population in opposition.
Puerto Vallarta-In Puerto Vallarta, the polls were very close since Luis Michel from the party National Regeneration Movement (Movimiento de Regeneración Nacional,  MORENA) had 33% of the votes, while Luis Ernesto Munguia of the Ecologist Green Party of Mexico (Partido Verde Ecologista de México) had 27.2%. In the election, Luis Michel is in first place with 32% of the votes, Maria Guadalupe Guerrero from the party Movimiento Ciudadano is in second place with 29%, and Luis Ernesto Munguia in third place with 26%.

Congress of Jalisco:

For the Congress of Jalisco, 38 deputies will be chosen. To choose the deputies, the state is divided into 20 districts, of which 1 deputy will be chosen from each district using simple majority, and the other 18 deputies will be chosen using proportional representation.

Michoacán
Governor, 40 deputies, 112 municipalities

Organized crime and indigenous groups block the installion of 100 of the 6,251 polling places in the state. A man was killed in Buenavista on June 6 in what appears to be a territorial dispute between drug cartels and not election-related.

Governor of Michoacán: Alfredo Ramirez Bedolla (MRN party) was declared the winner with 41.5% of the vote. Carlos Herrera Tello was second with 39%.

Mexico City
66 deputies and 16 borough mayors (alcaldias):

Juntos Hacemos Historia won the seven boroughs in the eastern half of the city.

Winning candidates for borough mayor:

Azcapotzalco: Margarita Saldana 
Álvaro Obregón: Lía Limón García 
Benito Juárez: Santiago Taboada
Coyoacán: Giovanni Gutierrez 
Cuajimalpa: Adrian Rubalcava 
Cuauhtémoc: Sandra Xantall Cuevas
Gustavo A. Madero: Francisco Chiguil 
Iztacalco: Raul Armando Quintero 
Iztapalapa: Clara Brugada 
Magdalena Contreras: Luis Gerardo Quijano 
Miguel Hidalgo: Mauricio Tabe 
Milpa Alta: Judith Venegas 
Tláhuac: Berenice Hernandez 
Tlalpan: Alfa Gonzalez Magallenes 
Venustiano Carranza: Evelyn Parra 
Xochimilco: Jose Carlos Acosta   and  request a recount.

Other candidates for borough mayor:
Cuauhtémoc – Dolores Padierna , former federal Senator (2012-2015) and federal Deputy (1997-2000 and 2003–2006)
Sugey Abrego 
Blue Demon Jr. (Redes Sociales Progresistas)
Alfredo Adame
Héctor Hernández

Mexico State
75 deputies, 125 municipalities

Several communities reported irregularities and violence on election day.

Mayoral elections:
Amecameca: Two people were injured during a shooting incident that interrupted voting for only a few minutes.
Metepec: Twenty men destroyed a polling place and hit voters, but voting continued later.
Naucalpan: A fake grenade briefly caused panic.
Nextlalpan: The Instituto Electoral del Estado de México (IEEM) says that irregularities and violence on election day make it impossible to give a preliminary vote count (PREP), it may be necessary to hold another election.  says that vandals entered the candidate's house and burned it, in addition to sexually assaulting the candidate, and they destroyed voting material.  says the allegation are false.
Valle de Chalco: Two polling stations were attacked by armed gunment, causing their early closure.
Tepotzotlán: Ángeles Zuppa Villegas , daughter of three-time mayor Ángel Zuppa Núñez.

Alderman:
Atizapán de Zaragoza: César Basilio Campos  is photographed with a gun reserved for the army. He is also known for driving a sports car worth ten times his salary.

Morelos
20 deputies, 33 municipalities

Municipal presidencies ( and Panal:
Jojutla: Juan Ángel Flores Bustamante  (reelected)
Jiutepec: Rafael Reyes  (reelected)
Puente de Ixtla: Claudia Mazari 
Cuautla Rodrigo Arredondo 
Axochiapan: Félix Sánchez 
Tlaltizapán: Gabriel Moreno 
Tlaquiltenango: Carlos Franco 
 won five municipalities by itself in addition to the ones it won in alliance with Morena: Jonacatepec, Tepalcingo, Zacatepec, Zacualpan de Amilpas, and Temoac.
Partido Redes Sociales Progresistas (RSP) won Jantetelco and Tlalnepantla. * won Tepoztlán.
Partido Apoyo Social won Tlayacapan.
Panal: Totolapan.
Morelos Progresa: Amacuzac.
Independent: Coatlán del Río: Celso Nieto.

Nayarit
Governor, 30 deputies, 20 municipalities, 138 councilmen (regidurías)

Lorenzo Córdova of the Instituto Nacional Electoral (INE) warned that Governor Antonio Echevarría said on February 26, 2021, that the state does not have the MXN $200 million needed to organize the elections. Córdova said on March 5 that Echevarría was lying to evade his responsibilities.

Nuevo León
Governor, 42 deputies, 51 municipalities

Mayoral candidates:
Cadereyta – Ernesto Quintanilla, “Juntos Haremos Historia”
Escobedo – Andrés Mijes Llovera, “Juntos Haremos Historia”
General Terán – Gabriela Garza Garza, “Juntos Haremos Historia”
Juárez – Héctor de la Garza Villarreal, “Juntos Haremos Historia”
Linares – María Guadalupe Guidi Kawas, “Juntos Haremos Historia”
Monterrey – Luis Donaldo Colosio Riojas , currently local deputy, son of former presidential candidate Luis Donaldo Colosio Murrieta
San Nicolás de los Garza – Josefina Villarreal González withdraws her candidacy from “Juntos Haremos Historia” alleging unequal treatment compared to male candidates.
San Pedro – Miguel Treviño, de Hoyos (incumbent), “Juntos Haremos Historia”

Local deputies:
District 1 – Mayco Fabián Tapia Quiñones (Fuerza por Mexico); assassinated during robbery attempt on March 24, 2021

Oaxaca

Polling places could not be installed on June 6 due to social-political conflicts in seven communities. 800 ballots were stolen in “El Ocote” y San José Llano Grande, Miahuatlán de Porfirio Díaz.

Puebla
41 deputies, 217 municipalities

Querétaro
Governor, 25 deputies, 18 municipalities
Querétaro City mayor – Adolfo Ríos

Quintana Roo
11 municipalities

Mayors seeking reelection:
Benito Juárez (Cancún) – Mara Lezama 
Tulum – Víctor Mas
Solidaridad (Playa del Carmen) – Laura Beristáin
José María Morelos – Sofía Alcocer.

Juan Carrillo, mayor of Isla Mujeres, was granted leave to run for the federal Chamber of Deputies.

Results in municipalities:
Solidaridad (Playa del Carmen): A recount was ordered at the request of Juntos Haremos Historia. Preliminary results show Liliana Campos (Va por Mexico) won with 24,460 votes defeated Laura Beristain Navarrete (Juntos Haremos Historia), who had 20,889 votes.

San Luis Potosí
Governor, 27 deputies, 58 municipalities

Mayoral candidates:
San Luis Potosí City – Xavier Nava , although many members of Morena objected to the candidacy of the former member of PRD and PAN.

Alderman:
Tamuín – Claudio Vega Roque . A shooting broke out as Vega Roque was filming a pro-campaign video on March 31. One injured.

Sinaloa
Governor, 40 deputies, 18 municipalities

Sonora
Governor, 33 deputies, 72 municipalities

Municipal presidents:
Hermosillo Municipality: Célida Teresa López Cárdenas  seeks reelection. He is criticized for calling pro-abortion femininists ″morons″.

Tabasco
35 deputies, 17 municipalities

Mayoral candidates:
Centro Municipality (Villahermosa)
Manuel Andrade , former governor ( 2002–2006) who spent five years in prison for embezzlement.
Andrés Granier , former governor (2007-2012).

Tamaulipas
36 deputies, 43 municipalities

Tlaxcala
Governor, 25 deputies, 60 municipalities, 299 community presidents

Veracruz
50 deputies, 212 municipalities

Mayors:
La Perla – Melquiades Vázquez Lucas (″El Pantera″) ; assassinated on March 4, 2021

Yucatan
25 deputies, 106 municipalities

Zacatecas
Governor, 30 deputies, 58 municipalities

Absentee voting
Mexican citizens from eleven states who live overseas can vote electronically. Most of the elections are for governor, but those from Mexico City and Guerrero will be able to vote for Diputado Migrante and people from Jalisco can vote for Diputado por Representación de Proporcional. INE approved a pilot program allowing prison inmates who are held in protective custody in Hermosillo (District 4, Sonora); Villa Comaltitlán, Chiapas; Coatlán del Río (District 4 Jojutla, Morelos); and Buena Vista Tomatlán (District 12 Apatzingán, Michoacán) to vote absentee ballot from May 17–19, 2021. The present order covers only male inmates, but it may be extended to females.

Organized crime and politics
Several different criminal gangs implicated in drug trafficking, human trafficking, and fuel theft have a great deal of political influence in some states. The Sinaloa Cartel exercises considerable control in the northwest while the Jalisco New Generation Cartel′s (CJNG) influence is in the west including Michoacan and Guerrero. The Gulf Cartel and Los Zetas are powerful in the northeast.

In the past, drug cartels have influenced campaigns by supporting candidates and even running some of their own member or sympathizers as candidates for office such as Lucero Sánchez López, former federal deputy from Sinaloa who was also Joaquín "El Chapo" Guzmán′s lover. Election-related violence is of particular concern in Michoacan, not only because of the aforementioned drug cartels but also because of armed community police who often act as vigilantes.

At least 64 murders related to the political process occurred between September 2020 and March 2021, and Security Secretary (SSP) Rosa Icela Rodríguez promised more protection from the “crime party.”

As of March 18, 55 candidates and precandidates had been murdered. 80% of the cases involved individuals who belonged to a party that did not control the state. Between September 7, 2020, and June 5, 2021, 91 candidates were assassinated.

Irregularities and election day violence

State of Mexico
Daniel Serrano, candidate for municipal president in Cuautitlán Izcalli, complained about vote buying on election day. The Instituto Electoral del Estado de México (IEEM) says that irregularities and violence on election day in Nextlalpan, State of Mexico, make it impossible to give a preliminary vote count (PREP), it may be necessary to hold another election.  says that vandals entered the candidate's house and burned it, in addition to sexually assaulting the candidate, and they destroyed voting material.  says the allegation are false.

Ricardo Almaraz , candidate for supplementary receiver in Tepotzotlán, State of Mexico, was shot and killed the day after the election, June 7.

Violence was reported in Amecameca, Metepec, Naucalpan, Nextlalpan, and Valle de Chalco.

Scheduled results
Counting for preliminary results (PREP) began on June 6, rapid counting on June 7, and certification of final results are due on August 23, 2021.

See also

2021 Mexican legislative election
2021 Mexican gubernatorial elections
2021 in Mexican politics and government
List of elections in 2021
List of political parties in Mexico

References

External links
 Elección Federal y elecciones locales: INE, Instituto Nacional Electoral (in Spanish)

Elections in Mexico
2021 elections in Mexico
Gubernatorial elections in Mexico
Elections in Mexico by state
Politics of Mexico